Lidija Dimkovska (Macedonian: , born 1971) is a Macedonian poet, novelist and translator. She was born in Skopje and studied comparative literature at the University of Skopje. She proceeded to obtain a PhD in Romanian literature at the University of Bucharest. She has taught Macedonian language and literature at the University of Bucharest and world literature at the University of Nova Gorica in Slovenia. She now lives in Ljubljana, working as a freelance writer and translator of Romanian and Slovenian literature.

Dimkovska is an editor at Blesok, the online Macedonian literary journal. She has won a number of literary prizes including:
the Hubert Burda literary prize for young East European poets (2009)
the Tudor Arghezi international poetry prize in Romania (2012)
the Macedonian Writers' Union award (2004 and 2012)
the EU Prize for Literature (2013)
the European Prize for Poetry Petru Krdu (2016)

Her first novel was Skrivena Kamera (Macedonian: , English: Hidden Camera, 2004). It won the Macedonian Writers' Union award and was shortlisted for the Utrinski Vesnik award for best novel of the year. Skrivena Kamera has been translated into Slovenian, Slovakian, Polish, Bulgarian, and Albanian. Her second novel A Spare Life (Macedonian: , Reserven zhivot, trans. Christina Kramer, 2012) also won the Macedonian Writers' Union award, as well as the EU Prize for Literature. Other books of hers include:

 Grandma Non-Oui (2016)
 When We Left "Karl Liebknecht", a short story collection (2019)

Her book of poems pH Neutral History (2012) was translated into English by Ljubica Arsovska and Peggy Reid and was nominated for the Best Translated Book Award by the online literary journal Three Percent. Her other poetry collections include:

 The Offspring of the East (1992)
 The Fire of Letters (1994)
 Bitten Nails (1998)
 Nobel vs. Nobel (2001)
 Do Not Awaken With Hammers (2006), translated by Ljubica Arsovska and Peggy Reid

References

1971 births
Macedonian women writers
Living people
Macedonian women poets
Women novelists
Macedonian poets
Macedonian translators
Macedonian women scientists
21st-century novelists
21st-century Macedonian poets
21st-century translators
Writers from Skopje
Ss. Cyril and Methodius University of Skopje alumni
University of Bucharest alumni
Academic staff of the University of Bucharest
Academic staff of the University of Nova Gorica
International Writing Program alumni
21st-century Macedonian writers